There are at least 3 named lakes and reservoirs in Broadwater County, Montana.

Lakes
 Boulder Lakes, el.

Reservoirs
 Plunket Lake, el. 
 Townsend Reservoir, el.

See also
 List of lakes in Montana

Notes

Bodies of water of Broadwater County, Montana
Broadwater